Celje Airport  ( or Letališče Levec) is a sport airport, located to the north of Levec near Celje in Slovenia.

References

External links 
 Aeroclub Celje site

Airports in Slovenia